Jake Hollman (born 26 August 2001) is an Australian professional footballer who plays as a midfielder for Macarthur FC.

Club career

Macarthur FC
In October 2020, Hollman joined Macarthur FC for their inaugural season. In February 2021, after playing in 5 out of a possible 8 matches, Hollman's contract was extended by a further two years.

Honours

Club
Macarthur
Australia Cup: 2022

International
Australia U20
AFF U-19 Youth Championship: 2019

References

External links

2001 births
Living people
Australian soccer players
Association football midfielders
Manly United FC players
Sydney FC players
Macarthur FC players
National Premier Leagues players
A-League Men players